Hans Leberecht (1 December 1910 – 10 November 1960) was an Estonian writer. Many of his works mirrored socialist realism. His most important work was a story Valgus Koordis (1949).

He was born in St. Petersburg. His childhood years passed in the village of Koordi in Järva County.

In 1944 he joined with Communist Party. After World War II, he lived in Tallinn.

He was a special correspondent for the newspaper Sovetskaya Estoniya.

Works

 story Valgus Koordis (1949)
 novel Kaptenid (1956)
 novel Sõdurid lähevad koju (1957)
 novel Vassarite paleed (1960)

References

1910 births
1960 deaths
Estonian male novelists
Estonian male short story writers
Estonian screenwriters
20th-century Estonian writers
Soviet writers
Estonian communists
People's Writers of the Estonian SSR
Members of the Supreme Soviet of the Estonian Soviet Socialist Republic, 1951–1955
Burials at Metsakalmistu